A fire occurred at the Manor Hotel in Quezon City, Metro Manila, Philippines on August 18, 2001. Killing 74 people, it is the worst recorded hotel fire in the country.

Building
The Manor Hotel occupied a six-storey concrete building along Kamias Road in Quezon City, Metro Manila. According to local authorities it was built around the late 1970s and could have been previously affected by an earlier fire. At the time of the fire, the building had no windows at the rear and its windows are blocked by white iron bars, which is a common anti-burglary feature. Its fire exits were also obstructed. The first two floors from the ground are used as office spaces.

Fire
The Manor Hotel fire occurred on August 18, 2001, at around 4:00 am (Philippine Standard Time).
 A security guard at an adjacent building fired three warning shots after he saw smoke coming out of an exhaust fan from the Manor Hotel at 3:50 am after which he heard an explosion. At that time, there were 236 registered guests. 172 of them were taking part in the three-day Destiny Conference Crusade by the Don Clowers Ministries, an American evangelical group based in Irving, Texas.

The third and fourth floors were the only part of the Manor Hotel building directly affected by fire but smoke reached the upper floors, which led to fatalities. According to Quezon City Mayor Feliciano Belmonte Jr., the fire may have started in a restaurant and karaoke bar on the third floor. Initial reports also suggest it may have started from the overheating of an air-conditioning unit. An alternate theory suggested that there was a short circuit in the ceiling of a third floor stockroom.

Firefighters attempted to save trapped occupants by sawing the iron bars in the hotel room's windows. Many of the guests huddled in their bathrooms. Two managed to jumped off from the building and survived.

The fire was put out at around 6:30 am.

Victims
74 died in the incident; 62 of which died on site. At least one body was found to be charred but investigators concluded most victims died due to asphyxiation or smoke inhalation. None of the American attendees to the Don Clowers conference were among the casualties, and all victims were Filipino nationals. The injured were rushed to different hospitals namely the East Avenue Medical Center, the Quirino Memorial and Medical Center, the Lung Center of the Philippines, the Quezon City Medical Center, the Quezon City General Hospital, and the Victoriano Luna General Hospital.

Aftermath

The Manor Hotel fire is the deadliest hotel fire in Philippine history, and the country's second-worst fire of any kind after the Ozone Disco fire of 1996 which killed around 160 people. The Christian conference attended by 8,000 people at the Araneta Coliseum on August 18 dedicated their service to the victims and families of the fire. President Gloria Macapagal Arroyo ordered an investigation of the fire and also personally visited the survivors of the fire.

Quezon City fire marshal Ricardo Lemence was removed from his position by Interior Secretary Joey Lina shortly after the fire. Charges were filed against multiple Manor Hotel and Quezon City government officials.

2019 convictions
Four Quezon City government officials and five Manor Hotel officers were convicted of charges in relation to the 2001 fire on March 29, 2019, by the Sandiganbayan's Seventh Division. The decision was upheld on September 3, 2019. The following were charged:

Notes

References

2001 in the Philippines
2001 fires in Asia
Fire disasters involving barricaded escape routes
Fires in the Philippines
2001 disasters in the Philippines
History of Metro Manila
Man-made disasters in the Philippines
August 2001 events in Asia
Hotel fires
Urban fires in Asia